Charles Gaulthier (21 December 1889 – 17 March 1952) was a French sailor. He competed in the 8 Metre event at the 1936 Summer Olympics.

References

External links
 

1889 births
1952 deaths
French male sailors (sport)
Olympic sailors of France
Sailors at the 1936 Summer Olympics – 8 Metre
Sportspeople from Rennes